KFDX-TV (channel 3) is a television station licensed to Wichita Falls, Texas, United States, serving as the NBC affiliate for the western Texoma area. It is owned by Nexstar Media Group alongside low-power MyNetworkTV affiliate KJBO-LD (channel 35); Nexstar also provides certain services to Fox affiliate KJTL (channel 18) under joint sales and shared services agreements (JSA/SSA) with Mission Broadcasting. The three stations share studios near Seymour Highway (US 277) and Turtle Creek Road in Wichita Falls, where KFDX-TV's transmitter is also located.

The station also operates four UHF digital translators—K27HM-D and K41HQ-D in Quanah, Texas, and K25JO-D and K29LJ-D in Altus, Oklahoma—which relay KFDX's signal to portions of southwestern Oklahoma and western north Texas that are not covered by the main channel 3 signal.

History

Early history
On June 27, 1952, Wichitex Radio and Television – a locally based company managed under the direction of Darrold A. Cannan, Sr. and Howard Fry – submitted an application to the Federal Communications Commission (FCC) for a construction permit to build and license to operate a broadcast television station in the Wichita Falls–Lawton market that would transmit on VHF channel 3. The FCC awarded the license and permit for channel 3 to the Cannan ownership group on December 19, 1952. Wichtex Radio and Television requested and received approval to assign KFDX-TV as the call letters for their television station, after the local radio station that Wichitex had signed on in November 1947, KFDX (990 AM, now Farmersville-licensed KFCD), itself a disambiguation of the calls used by the company's radio station in Beaumont, KFDM (now KLVI).

KFDX-TV first signed on the air at 6:00 p.m. on April 12, 1953; the first program ever broadcast on Channel 3 that evening was the local program People from Here and There. KFDX was the third television station to sign on in the Wichita Falls–Lawton market, launching one month after the sign-ons of its two principal competitors: CBS affiliate KWFT-TV (channel 6, now KAUZ-TV), which debuted on March 1, and Lawton-based KSWO-TV (channel 7), which had signed on March 8. Although KFDX radio had been an affiliate of the ABC Radio Network since 1947, channel 3 has operated as an NBC affiliate since its sign-on; this was essentially by default, as ABC Television had already maintained a primary affiliation with KSWO-TV at the time of KFDX-TV's sign-on. The station originally employed a staff of 30 people, which at the time, was the largest staff of any broadcast television and radio station in west Texas; the majority of stock held in Wichitex was owned by members of the station's staff.

In addition to founding channel 3 and serving as the station's original general manager, Howard Fry was best known by children in the Texoma region for his daily program Uncle Howdy's House Party, which originated on KFDX radio and launched a television broadcast that aired concurrently with the radio program. In 1955, Wichitex sold KFDX radio in order to concentrate on the television portion of the business. Among the personalities who worked at KFDX-TV during the station's early years was Don Alexander—lead singer of rock-and-roll group Alexander and the Greats, and composer of the 1964 hit single "Hot Dang Mustang," which topped songs from such musicians as Elvis Presley, The Kinks, Frank Sinatra and The Rolling Stones to peak at #6 on the Billboard Top 100—who came to the television station in 1964. For several years until he transitioned away from program hosting duties in 1966, Alexander served as host of Stage Coach Three, a weekday afternoon children's program featuring a mix of cartoon shorts and educational features; as the character of "Pinto Bean", a marshal who appeared alongside his horse sidekick Swayback, he also donned cowboy garb to host afternoon western and horror movies. After filing live reports on the Watts riots, which began as he was starting a planned trip to visit his mother in Los Angeles in August 1965, Alexander was promoted to main news anchor and occasionally headed KFDX's news department as its news director from 1966 until he departed from the station in 1980.

Nat Fleming, a local country and western bandleader, served as host of the self-titled, half-hour afternoon variety program The Nat Fleming Show on channel 3 from the station's inception in 1953 until the early 1960s, which featured a blend of musical performances (performed alongside bandmates Pee Wee Stewart, Elmer Lawrence, Buck White, Pappy Stapp and Tommy Bruce) and comedy skits. Fleming was also the longtime owner of The Cow Lot, a Wichita Falls-based western wear store which shuttered operations in 2006, and typically signed off television commercials for his store with the locally known tagline "You can tell by looking if it came from the Cow Lot" (the store also served as the homebase for the Horn Honkin' Show, a Saturday morning variety program that Fleming hosted for radio station KNIN-FM [92.9]). Fleming would be honored with the North Texas Legend Award by The Museum of North Texas History in May 2012.

Clay, Price and U.S. Broadcast Group ownership

On July 30, 1970, Wichitex Radio and Television, then managed by Fry and Darrold A. Cannan Jr., sold KFDX to Charleston, West Virginia-based Clay Communications for $5.05 million; the sale was approved on January 28, 1971. During the latter years under Wichitex ownership and its early years under the stewardship of Clay, the station uniquely identified its channel 3 position with the Roman numeral "III" starting in 1967; the station's on-air brand was further stylized with the "TV" suffix in the callsign rendered in lowercase preceding the numerals, as "KFDX-tv III", with the Roman numeral idenfier being used for its local newscasts (initially as TV-III News, and later as News III and Newscenter III, with the title of its agricultural news program stylized as RFD-III) and film presentations (as Matinee III and TV-III Golden Movies). The station reverted to using a conventional numerical logo in 1978, at which point the station modified its newscast branding as Newscenter 3.

As part of the divestiture of the company's newspaper and television properties, on April 30, 1987, Clay sold its KFDX and its four sister television stations—NBC affiliate KJAC-TV (now Fox affiliate KBTV-TV) in Beaumont–Port Arthur, and ABC affiliates WAPT in Jackson, Mississippi and WWAY in Wilmington, North Carolina—to New York City-based Price Communications Corporation for $60 million; the sale was approved by the FCC on June 23.

In August 1992, KFDX became the first television station in the Wichita Falls–Lawton market to adopt a 24-hour-a-day programming schedule, initially filling overnight time periods following the NBC late night lineup with a mix of syndicated programs, a nightly encore of the station's 10:00 p.m. newscast, and a feed loop of NBC's now-defunct overnight newscast, NBC Nightside. (Eventual sister station KJTL would follow in adopting a 24-hour schedule in September 1994.) On August 23, 1995, Price sold KFDX and fellow NBC affiliates KJAC-TV and KSNF-TV in Joplin, Missouri to Wakefield, Rhode Island-based upstart USA Broadcast Group for $42 million, retaining ABC affiliate WHTM-TV in Harrisburg, Pennsylvania as its sole television property (USA soon renamed itself to U.S. Broadcast Group after USA Network filed a copyright infringement complaint against the broadcasting company).

Nexstar ownership
On January 12, 1998, Irving-based Nexstar Broadcasting Group acquired KFDX-TV, KBTV-TV and KSNF from U.S. Broadcast Group for $64.3 million. Channel 3 subsequently gained two sister stations on June 1, 1999, when Nexstar took over the operations of Fox affiliate KJTL (channel 18) and UPN affiliate KJBO-LP (channel 35, now a MyNetworkTV affiliate)—which were acquired by Nexstar partner company Mission Broadcasting, which originated as an arm of its creditor Bastet Broadcasting, earlier that year for $15.5 million—under joint sales and shared services agreements, under which KFDX would handle news production, engineering, security and certain other services as well as handling advertising sales for the two stations.

In January 2006, KFDX launched Texoma's Weather Channel, a 24-hour weather forecast service—with content selected by the on-duty meteorologist—that features loops of weather radar and satellite imagery, current conditions (including maps detailing actual and apparent temperatures, sustained wind speeds and gusts within the KFDX viewing area), and local and regional forecasts, along with an audio feed of Wichita Falls-based NOAA Weather Radio station WXK31; Texoma's Weather Channel is carried on Charter Spectrum channel 17 and digital channel 1234 in Wichita Falls (the service is not carried on cable providers on the Oklahoma side of the market, including Fidelity Communications in Lawton).

In December 2020, the studio building was evacuated after vandals cut a couple of guy wires to the nearby  tower. The tower did not collapse, and repairs are being done to shore it back up.

Subchannel history

KFDX-DT2

As the low-power station's broadcasting radius is limited to the immediate Wichita Falls area, KFDX carries a simulcast of MyNetworkTV-affiliated sister station KJBO-LD on channel 3.2 in order to relay channel 35's programming throughout the entire Lawton–Wichita Falls market. Ever since its inception, the KJBO simulcast had been presented in 480i standard definition, with most programs (including the MyNetworkTV prime time schedule) airing in letterboxed 4:3; however, sometime in 2020, it had been upgraded into 1080i full high definition. On cable, KJBO-LD (via the KFDX-DT2 feed) is carried on Charter Spectrum channel 7 in Wichita Falls. (The subchannel/station is not currently carried by Fidelity Communications in Lawton.)

KFDX-DT3
KFDX-DT3 is the Laff-affiliated third digital subchannel of KFDX-TV, broadcasting in standard definition on channel 3.3.

On June 15, 2016, Nexstar Broadcasting Group announced that it had entered into an agreement with Katz Broadcasting to affiliate 81 stations owned and/or operated by the group—including KJTL and KFDX-TV—with one or more of Katz's four digital multicast networks, Escape (now Ion Mystery), Laff, Grit and Bounce TV (the latter of which is owned by Bounce Media LLC, whose COO Jonathan Katz serves as president/CEO of Katz Broadcasting). As part of the agreement, on September 1 of that year, KFDX launched a digital subchannel on virtual channel 3.3 to serve as an affiliate of Laff (the affiliation rights to the three other Katz networks were given to sister station KJTL, which launched three subchannels that affiliated respectively with Grit, Bounce TV and Escape on that same date).

KFDX-DT4
KFDX-DT4 is the Antenna TV–owned-and-operated fourth digital subchannel of KFDX-TV, broadcasting in standard definition on channel 3.4. On January 23, 2018, KFDX launched a digital subchannel on virtual channel 3.4 to serve as an affiliate of the classic television multicast network Cozi TV. On February 1, 2021, KFDX-DT4 became the new home for Antenna TV, replacing Cozi TV.

Programming
KFDX-TV currently broadcasts the majority of the NBC schedule, although the station currently does not clear most of NBC's overnight programming (preempting its weekend lifestyle lineup outright and carrying Early Today as a single half-hour broadcast instead of offering most of its customary overnight loop), preferring to carry an encore of the station's 10:00 p.m. newscast, infomercials and some syndicated programming in the designated time period (particularly on early Tuesday through Saturday mornings after Late Night with Seth Meyers). Syndicated programs broadcast by KFDX include Dr. Phil, Judge Judy, The 700 Club, Inside Edition and Entertainment Tonight.

News operation
, KFDX-TV presently broadcasts 22 hours of locally produced newscasts each week (with four hours each weekday and one hour each on Saturdays and Sundays). Channel 3 also produces the half-hour sports highlight/analysis program KFDX 3 Sports Sunday, which airs after the Sunday edition of the 10:00 p.m. newscast.

In addition, KFDX produces five hours of locally produced newscasts each week for Fox-affiliated sister station KJTL (with one hour on weekdays). Through the shared services agreement with KJTL, the station may also simulcast long-form severe weather coverage on channel 18 in the event that a tornado warning is issued for any county in its viewing area of southwestern Oklahoma and western north Texas. KFDX primarily competes for the Texas audience with KAUZ, while KSWO has a stronghold on the Oklahoma side of the market; overall, this puts KFDX at second place among the market's local newscasts.

News department history
A staple of channel 3's schedule was RFD-3, a long-running early morning agriculture and public affairs program which premiered in 1964. Originally airing weekdays at 6:30 a.m., before the launch of a conventional morning newscast in the early 1990s eventually led to the program moving to a 5:00 a.m. slot as the latter program expanded, it was hosted for the majority of its existence by Joe Brown, who served as the station's farm director beginning in the early 1960s and also worked as farm editor for the Wichita Falls Times Record News. RFD-3 ended its 47-year run in August 2011, following Brown's retirement from broadcasting. The station launched a similar program, Texoma Country, which originated as a 15-minute segment that aired during KFDX 3 News Today before expanding to a separate half-hour program serving as a lead-in to the morning newscast — as Texoma Country Morning — in 2014 (the program is co-hosted by Mike Campbell and Joe Tom White, who had previously co-hosted a morning news/talk show on KWFS [1290 AM]; White joined the program in 2014, after announcing his departure from KWFS).

For many years, Warren Silver – who originally joined KFDX as a member of its production staff when it signed on in March 1953 — served as the station's chief weathercaster and continuity announcer as well as acting as the original host of RFD-3. After the station's sale to Clay Communications, Silver was promoted to a management position as the station's general manager, and headed channel 3's operations from 1971 to 1988. After his retirement, Silver continued to serve as a contributor for the station's newscasts, hosting "The Silver Report", a weekly feature segment reporting on issues affecting senior citizens that aired during the 6:00 p.m. edition of Newscenter 3 until his death in 2001. Another longtime weathercaster who appeared on channel 3's newscasts from 1954 to 1971 was Tom Crane, who was known by his nickname, "Tom Crane, the Weathervane." After he left KFDX, Crane worked as vice president of City National Bank in Wichita Falls, and later operated local advertising agency Crane & Company from 1980 until his death on July 6, 2009.

During the late morning of April 3, 1964, a destructive tornado ripped through the City View section of northwestern Wichita Falls and neighboring Sheppard Air Force Base. The event made history as it would become one of the first tornadoes ever to be shown on live television. As rival KAUZ-TV interrupted regular programming that morning to show live footage of the tornado through a studio camera brought outside of channel 6's Seymour Highway studios, KFDX also moved one of its studio cameras outside its facility and pointed it toward the tornado—which initially appeared as a large, rotating dust cloud—as it approached the northwest portion of Wichita Falls, with Shaw and reporter Dee Fletcher providing commentary (sometimes interfered by line voltage and wind noise severe enough that cameramen positioned outside could not hear instructions warning viewers of the approaching tornado over their headphones). The  tornado (later retroactively rated as an F5 on the Fujita Scale) killed seven people, injured 111 others, and produced damage estimated at $15 million (with around 225 homes and businesses on the north side of town and at Sheppard AFB being reported destroyed).

During the afternoon and evening of April 10, 1979, about 15 years after the City View twister, KFDX-TV provided complete coverage of an outbreak of tornadic thunderstorms that spawned several strong to violent tornadoes across northwest Texas and southwestern Oklahoma. That evening's coverage culminated with the opening segment of the 6:00 p.m. edition of Newscenter 3, as chief meteorologist Bill Warren was relaying reports of a multiple-vortex tornado that was beginning its path of destruction across southern sections of Wichita Falls. Four minutes into the newscast, electricity to the KFDX studio and transmitter facilities went down as the storm knocked sections of the city's electrical grid offline. (KAUZ, KSWO and five of the six radio stations operating in the Wichita Falls area at the time also lost power in the storm, although local radio station KTRN [102.3, now KWFS-FM] was able to remain on-air as it had an auxiliary power supply). Along its ,  path, the F4 tornado killed 42 and injured more than 1,700 people, and produced damage estimated at around $400 million; among the 20,000 residents estimated to have been left homeless because of the twister, sixteen of them were part of KFDX-TV's 39-person staff at the time. When the station came back on the air at 6:56 p.m. the following evening (April 11), KFDX provided 3½ hours of continuous live coverage of the aftermath of the tornado. One week later, Channel 3 broadcast a half-hour documentary about the 1979 tornado, Terrible Tuesday, chronicling the Wichita Falls tornado and its aftermath by way of news footage taken by the station after the storm.

Former KFDX chief meteorologist Skip McBride, a retired airman who joined the station as its weekday evening meteorologist on January 29, 1983, was the area's longest-running local television weathercaster. McBride's 31-year tenure—which lasted until his retirement on November 20, 2014—was surpassed only by that of Joe Brown for the longest-tenured television personality in the Wichita Falls-Lawton market; McBride was replaced as chief meteorologist by Kevin Selle (who joined KFDX/KJTL from Texas Cable News, where he previously served as chief meteorologist since the regional news channel's launch in 1998).

In August 1992, KFDX also implemented the "24-Hour News Source" concept (which was enforced in the promotional slogan used by the station until 2005, "Texoma's 24-Hour News Team"). Providing news headlines to viewers at times when the station was not carrying regularly scheduled, long-form newscasts, the concept involved both the production of 30-second news updates that aired at or near the top of each hour and brief weather updates every half-hour during local commercial break inserts within syndicated and NBC network programs – even during prime time network and overnight programming – in addition to the existing half-hourly updates it aired during Today. (Producers and other newsroom personnel anchored the segments for several years during the 1990s.) KFDX discontinued production of these hourly updates in 2005.

Following its sale to Mission Broadcasting and the formation of the SSA between the two stations, on September 20, 1999, KFDX began producing a half-hour newscast at 9:00 p.m. through a news share agreement with Fox affiliate KJTL; the program, titled Fox 18 News at 9:00, was the first local prime time newscast to debut in the market and originated from a secondary set at the KFDX/KJTL/KJBO studios on Seymour Highway in Wichita Falls. The newscast was eventually cancelled after the December 31, 2001 edition, due to poor ratings. After a four-year sabbatical, KFDX launched a second venture at a prime time newscast for channel 18 on September 17, 2007. Originally titled Fox: Texoma's News at 9:00 (later retitled Texoma's Fox News at Nine in September 2011). The program competed against an existing 9:00 newscast on CW affiliate KAUZ-DT2, which parent station KAUZ-TV premiered in September 2006; it would gain another prime time news competitor in September 2012, when KSWO began producing a newscast for its Live Well Network-affiliated DT3 subchannel (now a This TV affiliate). As a result of the cancellations of KSWO and KAUZ's 9:00 news broadcasts (in September 2015 and July 2017, respectively), the KFDX-produced newscast is currently the only local prime time news program in the market.

In July 2012, KFDX became the second television station in the Wichita Falls-Lawton market (after KSWO) to begin broadcasting its local newscasts in high definition; the 9:00 p.m. newscast on KJTL was included in the upgrade. Footage shot in-studio has been broadcast in high definition since the conversion, while all news video from on-remote locations was initially broadcast in standard definition and upconverted to widescreen until April 2013, when KFDX/KJTL upgraded its ENG vehicles, satellite truck, studio and field cameras and other equipment in order to broadcast news footage from the field and the newsroom in high definition, in addition to segments broadcast from the main studio.

Notable former on-air staff
 Heidi Collins – anchor/reporter (now at KMSP-TV in Minneapolis)
 Brad Edwards – anchor/reporter/photographer (1971–1973; later at KFOR-TV in Oklahoma City, deceased)
 John Hambrick – anchor/reporter (1964; deceased)
 Megan Henderson – news anchor/reporter (now anchor at KTLA in Los Angeles)
 Don Owen – reporter (1953–1954; later longtime anchor at KSLA in Shreveport, deceased)
 Frances Rivera – news anchor/reporter (now anchor at MSNBC)

Technical information

Subchannels
The station's digital signal is multiplexed:

Analog-to-digital conversion
KFDX-TV signed on a digital signal on UHF channel 28 in 2003; the station began broadcasting NBC network programming in high definition in 2009, when KFDX upgraded its main digital feed to the 1080i resolution format. The station shut down its analog signal, over VHF channel 3, on June 12, 2009, the official date in which full-power television stations in the United States transitioned from analog to digital television under federal mandate. The station's digital signal remained on its pre-transition UHF channel 28. Through the use of PSIP, digital television receivers display the station's virtual channel as its former VHF analog channel 3.

Translators

References

External links
 Official website for KFDX-TV, KJTL and KJBO-LD

NBC network affiliates
Laff (TV network) affiliates
Antenna TV affiliates
FDX-TV
Television channels and stations established in 1953
1953 establishments in Texas
Nexstar Media Group